WJSK-LP (101.1 FM) was a radio station licensed to Bartlett, New Hampshire, United States. The station was last owned by The Bartlett-Jackson Community Broadcasters Association. Its license was surrendered to the Federal Communications Commission on January 2, 2021 and cancelled on January 7.

See also
 List of jazz radio stations in the United States
 List of community radio stations in the United States

References

External links
 

JSK-LP
Community radio stations in the United States
JSK-LP
Carroll County, New Hampshire
Radio stations established in 2003
Radio stations disestablished in 2021
Defunct radio stations in the United States
Defunct community radio stations in the United States
JSK-LP
2021 disestablishments in New Hampshire